Eddie Livington Segura Martínez (born 2 February 1997) is a Colombian professional footballer who last played as a defender for Major League Soccer club Los Angeles FC.

Club career
Segura started his career with Deportivo Pereira and made his senior debut in Categoría Primera B as a 16-year-old on 5 May 2013, playing the whole match in a 4–2 win away at Universitario Popayán. In 2017, he joined Atlético Huila and played his first match in Categoría Primera A on 5 February 2017, in a 1–1 draw with Patriotas Boyacá.

On 21 November 2018, Segura joined MLS club Los Angeles FC on a six month loan deal with an option to make the deal permanent. On 29 July 2019, Segura's move to Los Angeles was made permanent.

International career
In November 2019, Segura received his debut international call-up, with the Colombia under-23 national team for a friendly against Japan.

Career statistics

Club

Honours
Los Angeles FC
MLS Cup: 2022
Supporters' Shield: 2019, 2022

References

External links

Colombian National Coach Trains with Under 20 Soccer Players

1997 births
Living people
Colombian footballers
Colombian expatriate footballers
Colombian expatriate sportspeople in the United States
Association football defenders
People from Pereira, Colombia
Deportivo Pereira footballers
Atlético Huila footballers
Los Angeles FC players
Las Vegas Lights FC players
Categoría Primera B players
Categoría Primera A players
Major League Soccer players
USL Championship players